Season 2017–18 was Dumbarton's sixth in the second tier of Scottish football, having finished eighth in 2016–17. Dumbarton also competed in the Challenge Cup, Scottish League Cup and the Scottish Cup.

Story of the season

May 
May started with Stevie Aitken releasing four members of the squad, on top of the two who had already agreed deals elsewhere. Garry Fleming lead the list, departing after 179 appearances for the club, he was joined by Tom Lang, Mark Docherty and Donald McCallum. Also leaving the club were Robert Thomson who joined Greenock Morton and Andy Stirling who joined Queen of the South.

The club's Head of Youth, Tony McNally, was next to leave, on 19 May. Meanwhile, Les Hope was announced as the club's new chairman, replacing Alan Jardine.

Manager Stevie Aitken agreed a new two-year contract with the club on 24 May, and he was joined in agreeing terms for the new campaign by assistant Ian Durrant. Seven players also signed contracts for the new season, with Christian Nadé, Stuart Carswell, Calum Gallagher, Grant Gallagher, Kyle Prior, David Smith and Jamie Ewings all agreeing one year contracts. Defender Gregor Buchanan turned down a new deal however, and joined St Mirren. Player of the year Alan Martin also moved on. Joining Queen of the South.

The club's chief scout (and former player) Stuart Millar moved on, on 28 May, joining Stranraer in a similar role.

May ended with the club's sponsorship deal with Cheaper Insurance Direct expiring, meaning that the stadium reverted to being called the Dumbarton Football Stadium.

June 
June started with a press release stating that the club's owners (Brabco) had formally applied for planning permission for a new stadium.

Dumbarton were then drawn against Kilmarnock, Ayr United, Annan Athletic and Clyde in the group stage of the Scottish League Cup.

On 6 June club captain Darren Barr rejected a new deal to join Greenock Morton as the coach of their development squad.

Pre-season friendlies were announced, with a game against Albion Rovers at Cliftonhill, and home matches against Clydebank and Partick Thistle scheduled.

Jamie Ewings was announced as the club's new goalkeeper coach on 9 June, before Andy Dowie became their first signing of the summer – joining from Queen of the South. Forward Mark Stewart was next to sign, joining the club after three seasons with Raith Rovers. A week later Tom Walsh rejoined the club on a one-year deal from Limerick, having spent time on loan at the club during the 2015–16 season. Defender Craig Barr was next to arrive, from Raith Rovers, on a one-year deal, Barr's signing was followed by that of goalkeeper Scott Gallacher from Hibernian.

On 26 June there were further boardroom changes, as Ian Wilson (one of the main members of Brabco, and drivers behind the new stadium move) resigned from the board, in order to concentrate on the holding company's other interests. On the same day midfielder David Wilson joined having left Partick Thistle. A day later it became clear that the new stadium development was in difficulty over fears that it could destroy a former home of Robert the Bruce. June ended with the club revealing their new Joma home kit, which was a modern take on their traditional white, black and gold colours.

July 
July 1 saw the team take to the pitch for the first time in a low key 0-0 draw with Stranraer at Lochinch Park. Winger Chris Johnston became the club's third summer arrival from Raith Rovers, after Mark Stewart and Craig Barr, joining on 7 July. That was followed by a 1-1 draw with Albion Rovers at Cliftonhill, where Calum Gallagher scored his first goal for the club. The first home pre-season friendly saw Sons host Scottish Premiership side Partick Thistle. Goals by Christian Nadé and trialist Jordan Allan gave Stevie Aitken's men a 2-1 win.

A day later it was announced that summer signing Andy Dowie would be the club's new captain, taking over the role vacated by Darren Barr. Dumbarton ended their pre-season campaign unbeaten, after goals from Calum Gallagher and Mark Stewart gave them a 2-1 victory over local rivals Clydebank on 15 July. The same day the club announced the double signing of defenders Christopher McLaughlin and Dougie Hill.

On 17 July a new 2 year sponsorship deal was agreed with local radio station Your Radio, which saw the Dumbarton Football Stadium become known as The Your Radio 103FM Stadium. Prior to the start of the Betfred Cup campaign, striker Ally Roy joined on loan from Hearts. Following injuries to Grant Gallagher and Stuart Carswell midfielder Kyle Hutton joined the squad from St Mirren on 21 July, having previously worked with Ian Durrant at Rangers. A week later former Hibernian midfielder Danny Handling joined the club, having negotiated his release from the Easter Road club.

Once again Dumbarton exited the Betfred Cup at the group stage, following a dismal run which included defeats to Ayr United, Clyde and Kilmarnock as well as a penalty shootout defeat to Annan Athletic.

August 
August began with Stevie Aitken securing the signing of Celtic U20s captain Sam Wardrop on a season long development loan. Dumbarton's league season began with a 0-0 draw at home to Greenock Morton. In the Scottish Challenge Cup Dumbarton tasted victory for first time since 2015 (and for only the sixth time in their history) as they overcame Rangers U20s 2-1. Calum Gallagher and Mark Stewart got the Sons goals – their first competitive strikes for the club. After scoring just once in four league games (two draws, two defeats) Stevie Aitken dipped into the transfer market again on 30 August to sign Ross County striker Greg Morrison, on loan from the Scottish Premiership side until January. On deadline day he added to the squad again, signing Cypriot attacker Dimitris Froxylias from Ermis Aradippou.

September 
September began with a 2-1 Scottish Challenge Cup success over Welsh Premier League runners-up Connah's Quay Nomads at the YOUR Radio 103FM Stadium, in what was the first competitive match in history between Sons and a Welsh side. An early Callum Morris penalty gave the visitors the lead, before David Wilson equalised with his first senior goal. That sent the game into extra-time, with debutant Dimitris Froxylias scoring a final minute free-kick to win the tie. Their reward was another home tie, this time against Scottish League One Stranraer managed by Aitken's former assistant at Dumbarton Stevie Farrell.

In the league, the Sons finally secured their first league victory of the campaign on 16 September, beating fellow part-timers Brechin City 2-1 at the YOUR Radio 103FM Stadium thanks to late goals from Mark Stewart and Dimitris Froxylias. They followed this up with another 2-1 home victory, this time against Inverness Caledonian Thistle in the first ever league meeting between the sides. Dimitris Froxylias scored again, with Celtic loanee Sam Wardrop scoring the winner with his first goal in senior football. The month ended with a 2-1 defeat against Livingston at Almondvale Stadium, where Tom Walsh scored his first goal of his second spell with the club.

October 
October began with Sons making it into the quarter finals of the Scottish Challenge Cup for the first time in 15 years after a 2-1 success against Stranraer. They were drawn to face Raith Rovers in the next round.

Back on league duty, the side fell to their second consecutive defeat, against St Mirren at the YOUR Radio 103FM Stadium.

In the Scottish Cup meanwhile, Sons were handed a home tie against Elgin City.

A draw with Morton at Cappielow followed, with Mark Stewart scoring an early opener. The following week attacker Dimitris Froxylias agreed a contract extension until the end of the season, after impressing with 3 goals and 2 assists in his 8 appearances for the club. The month ended winless in the league for Sons, with Dundee United taking all three points thanks to two goals from former Dumbarton loanee Sam Stanton.

November 

November began with Sons securing their first away league win of the season, 1-0 against Brechin City thanks to an injury time Willie Dyer own-goal. The Sons made it two victories in a row, and made it to the semi-finals of the Scottish Challenge Cup for the first time in their history, the following week - with a 2-0 success over Raith Rovers thanks to goals from Christopher McLaughlin and Ally Roy. A further success followed a week later, as Stuart Carswell's first career goal was enough to defeat Elgin City in the Scottish Cup. Sons continued the run, as Dimitris Froxylias returned from injury with a stunning goal in a 2-2 draw with Dunfermline Athletic. They ended the month undefeated, with Greg Morrison scoring his first goal for the club in a 2-2 draw with Queen of the South.

December 

The good form continued into December, as Tom Walsh scored the winner against his former club St Mirren, a result that knocked the Paisley club off the top of the table. After going through November unbeaten, Stevie Aitken was named Ladbrokes Championship Manager of the Month. Sons finally fell to their first defeat since October, against Inverness on 16 December. This was followed by a 0-0 draw with Falkirk in which left-back Chris McLaughlin was stretchered off with a serious injury. Three days later Sons were back in action again, falling to a 4-1 defeat at home to Livingston, with Kyle Hutton being sent-off. Snow forced their final scheduled game of the year, a home tie against Greenock Morton to be called off. The month ended with left-back Liam Dick joining the club from Stranraer.

January 
Dumbarton opened the year with a goal-less draw against Queen of the South at Palmerston Park. Later in the week young midfielder Kyle Prior joined Lowland Football League side BSC Glasgow on loan until the end of the season. An early Joe Cardle goal consigned the club to their first defeat of 2018 against Dunfermline Athletic, a result that also left them without a home league victory since September. Iain Russell became the club's second signing of the January window, as he came out of retirement to re-join the club after leaving in 2006. A day later Sons tasted defeat again, going down 0-2 against league leaders St Mirren at the YOUR Radio 103FM Stadium, meaning that they still hadn't scored in 2018. Post-match it was confirmed that attacker Ally Roy wouldn't be having his loan spell from Hearts extended. On 22 January striker Kevin Nisbet joined the club on loan from Partick Thistle. A day later Dumbarton extended their run in the Scottish Cup with a 3-2 victory against Peterhead at Balmoor Stadium thanks to a double from Calum Gallagher and Iain Russell's first goal for the club since returning. That set up a fifth round tie with Greenock Morton. Despite the cup success however, Dumbarton remained winless (and goal-less) in the league in 2018, as first-half goals from Alan Lithgow and Ryan Hardie consigned them to a 2-0 defeat to Livingston. On the penultimate day of the January transfer window winger Andy Stirling returned to the club on-loan from Queen of the South.

February 
Dumbarton's first scheduled game of February against Brechin City fell victim to the weather. A week later winger Chris Johnston left the club on an emergency loan - joining Peterhead. The same day defender Aidan Wilson joined on an emergency loan from Rangers. After defeat to Greenock Morton in the Scottish Cup Aitken re-entered the emergency loan market, to add midfielder Liam Burt on a 28 day loan from Rangers. There was reason to be cheerful a day later, as Dumbarton made it to their first major national cup final for more than 100 years. Danny Handling's first goal for the club was followed by a stunning, late, Dimitris Froxylias free-kick, as Sons overcame Welsh Premier League Champions The New Saints to reach the final of the Scottish Challenge Cup. Four days later, and back on league action, Sons suffered defeat at the hands of Greenock Morton - despite a strong first half showing. Next up was a 0-0 draw with eighth placed Falkirk - a result that left the Sons still searching for their first league goal of 2018.

March 
With no game scheduled for the first weekend in March due to the Scottish Cup, Dumbarton started the month with defeat against Queen of the South at the Your Radio stadium on 10 March. That was followed by the club's first league win (and goal) of the year, as Dimitris Froxylias scored the only goal in a victory against Brechin City. Four days later Brechin were defeated again, this time at Glebe Park, thanks to first league goals for the club from Calum Gallagher and Danny Handling and a Sean Crighton own-goal. It was heartbreak in the 2018 Scottish Challenge Cup Final however, as Carl Tremarco won the game in injury time for Inverness Caledonian Thistle. The month ended with heavy defeats, 5-0 at table-topping St Mirren, and 3-0 against playoff bound Livingston, where Grant Gallagher made his return after 18 months out injured.

April 
April opened with a 2-0 midweek defeat against Dundee United. Four days later Sons faced the same opponents, and won 3-2, having gone ahead three times thanks to goals from Calum Gallagher and a brace from Craig Barr. It was then announced that Helensburgh based solicitor John Steele would become the club's new Chairman during the summer, replacing Les Hope who took up the role in May 2017. On the park meanwhile a last minute defeat to Greenock Morton left the Sons eight points adrift of eighth placed Falkirk with just four games remaining. Ninth place was confirmed after two defeats in five days to Inverness Caledonian Thistle, coupled with victory for Falkirk against Champions St Mirren, left the Sons 11 points adrift with just two matches remaining. During the match goalkeeper Jamie Ewings made his first league appearance for the club since May 2016 as a substitute for the injured Scott Gallacher. Ewings' first start followed, in a 5-2 defeat to Falkirk where Liam Burt scored his first goal for the club. Post-match Andy Dowie was named as the club's Player of the Year, Christopher McLaughlin won Young Player of the Year and Craig Barr won Players' Player of the Year. The league season ended with a 4-0 defeat to Dunfermline Athletic with Barr sent off after just nine minutes, setting up a playoff semi-final tie with Arbroath.

May 
May opened with the club's stadium sponsorship deal with Your Radio being terminated due to the station's financial situation. In the first-leg of the playoff final Sons defeated League One Arbroath 2-1 thanks to an injury time Craig Barr goal - with the defender only playing after appealing his red card. The second leg finished 1-1, with Dougie Hill scoring his first goal for the club. The same day the Dumbarton Football Stadium was renamed as the 'C&G Systems Stadium' thanks to a new three year sponsorship deal. In the first-leg of the final, a stunning Stuart Carswell goal (just the second of his career) was enough to defeat Alloa Athletic. In the second-leg however the Sons lost by two goals to nil after extra-time, meaning relegation to Scottish League One for the first time since the 2011-12 season.

First team transfers 
From end of 2016–17 season, to last match of season 2017–18

In

Out

Fixtures and results

Friendlies

Scottish Championship

Scottish Championship play-offs

Scottish Cup

Scottish League Cup

Table

Matches

Scottish Challenge Cup

League table

Player statistics

All competitions

References 

Dumbarton
Dumbarton